= Naurang Serai railway station =

Najrang Serai railway station

General information
- Owner: Ministry of Railways

Other information
- Station code: NUS

History
- Former names: Great Indian Peninsula Railway

Naurang Serai railway station or Serai Naurang railway station (Urdu: نجرنگ سرائے ریلوے اسٹیشن) is located in the province of Khyber Pakhtunkhwa, Pakistan. This is one of the rail station of the Serai Naurang city.

== See also ==
- List of railway stations in Pakistan
- Pakistan Railways
